David Llewellyn Harding (12 October 1867 – 26 December 1952), known professionally as Lyn Harding, was a Welsh actor who spent 40 years on the stage before entering British made silent films, talkies and radio. He had an imposing and menacing stage presence and came to be cast as the villain in many films, notably Professor Moriarty in dramatisations of the Sherlock Holmes stories.

Early years
He was born in 1867 at St. Brides Wentloog, in Monmouthshire, into a strict Congregationalist Welsh-speaking family.

Acting career
He started his career as an apprentice draper in Newport, Wales and but he was drawn to an acting career. He began giving readings from Shakespeare at a chapel in Cardiff. In 1890 a chance meeting with a touring group on a train led to him standing in for a sick actor and his first professional engagement. He opened on 28 August 1890 in The Grip Of Iron at the Theatre Royal, Bristol.

He toured "the provinces" and eventually made his London debut at the Shakespeare Theatre, Clapham on 19 July 1897.

He later changed his name to "Lyn" to make it more acceptable to English audiences who found "Llewellyn" difficult to pronounce.

In 1910, he portrayed Dr Grimesby Rylott in Arthur Conan Doyle's play The Speckled Band.

His career spanned stage, silent screen, talkies and radio productions and he toured in the United States, Japan, India and Burma. He worked at different times with John Gielgud, Ralph Richardson and Anthony Quayle.

His last stage appearance was as Abu Hassan in Chu Chin Chow in the West End in 1941 when he was 74 years old. At the age of nearly 80 he played Owain Glyndŵr in Shakespeare's Henry IV for BBC radio.

He lived for about ten years in Leverstock Green, near Hemel Hempstead where he played an active role in the local community, even staging plays and revues with fellow actors to help raise funds for a much needed parish hall. He died in London in 1952, aged 85.

Filmography

Selected stage credits
 The Speckled Band (1910, Conan Doyle)
 Henry VIII (1916, Shakespeare)
 Wild Heather (1917, Brandon)
 Grand Hotel (1931, Knoblock)

References

External links

1867 births
1952 deaths
19th-century Welsh male actors
20th-century Welsh male actors
Welsh male film actors
Welsh male stage actors
Welsh male silent film actors
Welsh male radio actors
People from Newport, Wales
Welsh Congregationalists